Paraburkholderia hospita is a species of bacteria in the phylum Pseudomonadota.

References

hospita
Bacteria described in 2003